Aspøya is an artificial island in Tingvoll Municipality in Møre og Romsdal county, Norway. It is located between the Freifjorden and the Tingvollfjorden.  The European route E39 highway crosses Aspøya and connects it to the nearby island of Bergsøya to the west by the Bergsøysund Bridge–part of the Krifast bridge and tunnel system which connects the town of Kristansund to the mainland. To the east, the E39 highway connects it to the Straumsnes peninsula in Tingvoll.

The highest point on the  island is the  mountain Vettafjellet. The completion of the canal, therefore, made Aspøya into an island.

See also
List of islands of Norway

References

Tingvoll
Islands of Møre og Romsdal